Peter Deeg  (14 May 1908 – 25 June 2005) was a German lawyer, writer and politician. He was a member of the NSDAP and later the Christian Social Union of Bavaria.

Early politics
Peter Deeg was born in Bad Kissingen. He was a NSDAP party-member since the year 1928. He became famous in connection with the so-called "Mordfall von Waltershausen" (Murder of Waltershausen), with a spectacular court hearing in 1933. This conflict has an antisemitic background. Because of the contact to important lawyers, he came in contact with Julius Streicher, who became his mentor.

Nazism
Julius Streicher allowed Deeg to publish his books in the NSDAP publishing house Der Stürmer. Between 1938 and 1940, three famous books were published: Hofjuden (Court Jew), Die Judengesetze Großdeutschlands (Jewish laws of Großdeutschland), Vor 50 Jahren. Für und wider den Russen-Pakt (50 years ago – pro or against the pact with Russia). Since 1940, Deeg seemed to be in conflict with the NSDAP. But this part of his life is not very clear.

After World War II
After World War II, Deeg became a close friend to Franz Josef Strauss. Together with him, he was a part of the Spiegel scandal.

Works
 Qualifizierte Beihilfe in: „Goltdammer’s Archiv für Strafrecht“ (GoltdA) 1933.
 Inhalt und Ausübung des Strafantragsrechtes. Eine strafrechtliche Studie für Theorie und Praxis (Diss.) Stuttgart 1933.
 Der Judeneid unter Friedrich dem Großen in: „Zeitschrift der Akademie für deutsches Recht“ (ZAkDR) 1937.
 Hofjuden. Juden, Judenverbrechen und Judengesetze in Deutschland von der Vergangenheit bis zur Gegenwart (Hrsg. v. Julius Streicher) Nürnberg 1938. Internet Archive
 Die Judenpolitik Friedrichs des Großen in: „Deutsches Recht“ (DR 1, 2) 1938.
 Die Judengesetze Großdeutschlands (Hrsg. v. Julius Streicher) Nürnberg 1939.
 Vor 50 Jahren. Für und wider den Russen-Pakt Nürnberg 1940.
 Die Glanzvolle Leipzig 1942.
 together with Dietrich Deeg Zur Genealogie und Lebensgeschichte der Äbte Degen von Ebrach und Weiner von Banz Neustadt an der Aisch 1974.

See also
List of Bavarian Christian Social Union politicians

1908 births
2005 deaths
Christian Social Union in Bavaria politicians
People from Bad Kissingen
Nazi propagandists